Novopolotsk are a bandy club from Belarus.

References

Bandy clubs in Belarus